Piano Trio No. 5 may refer to:

 Piano Trios, Op. 70 (Beethoven)
 Piano Trio No. 5 (Mozart)